Irving Israel (February 13, 1917 - December 23, 1990) was an American actor, director and producer. He was nominated for three Primetime Emmy Awards in the categories Outstanding Drama Series and Outstanding Television Movie for his work on the television programs The Name of the Game and Quincy, M.E.. Irving died in December 1990 following heart surgery in hospital at San Diego, California, at the age of 73. He was buried in Hillside Memorial Park Cemetery.

References

External links 

Rotten Tomatoes profile

1917 births
1990 deaths
People from New York (state)
Male actors from New York (state)
American television producers
American television directors
American male film actors
20th-century American male actors
Burials at Hillside Memorial Park Cemetery